Lynn N. Hemingway is a Democratic member of the Utah House of Representatives, representing the 40th District in Salt Lake, Utah. Hemingway was elected in to the Utah House of Representatives in 2006, and served through 2018.

Early life and career
Hemingway studied at Westminster College and the University of Utah. In 2002, Hemingway retired from the Williams Company. His wife works as a real estate office manager.

Elections
 2006 Hemmingway was unopposed for the 2006 Democratic Primary and won the November 7, 2006 General election with 4,618 votes against Republican nominee Duane Millard.
 2008 Hemmingway was unopposed for the June 2008 Democratic Primary and won the November 4, 2008 General election with 4,719 votes (54.1%) against Republican nominee Daniel Marriot.
 2010 Hemmingway was unopposed for the June 2010 Democratic Primary and won the three-way November 2, 2010 General election with 4,279 votes (49.8%) against Republican nominee Val Bateman and Libertarian Sandra Johnson.
 2012 Hemmingway was unopposed for the June 26, 2012 Democratic Primary and won the November 6, 2012 General election with 8,777 votes (59.7%) against Republican nominee Grace Sperry.
In March 2014, Hemingway announced that he would not be seeking reelection.

However, on November 13, 2015, Hemingway was appointed to the House by Governor Gary Herbert, replacing former State Representative Justin Miller.

Tenure
During the 2016 legislative session, Hemingway served on the Retirement and Independent Entities Committee, the Infrastructure and General Government Appropriations Subcommittee, the House Public Utilities and Technology Committee, the House Political Subdivisions Committee, and the House Retirement and Independent Entities Committee. During the interim, Hemingway serves on the Natural Resources, Agriculture, and Environment Interim Committee Interim, the Public Utilities, Energy, and Technology Interim Committee, and the Retirement and Independent Entities Interim Committee, He is also a representative on the Utah International Relations and Trade Commission.

2016 sponsored legislation

Hemingway also floor sponsored SB0253 Animal Shelter Revisions.

References

External links
Utah House of Representatives - Lynn N. Hemingway 'official UT House profile
Project Vote Smart - Lynn Hemingway profile
 at BallotpediaFollow the Money'' - Lynn Hemingway
2006 campaign contributions

Living people
21st-century American politicians
University of Utah alumni
Westminster College (Utah) alumni
Democratic Party members of the Utah House of Representatives
Year of birth missing (living people)